Odoardo Farnese (12 August 1666 – 6 September 1693) was the eldest son of Duke Ranuccio II Farnese, Duke of Parma and Piacenza. Odoardo was the Hereditary Prince of Parma from his birth until his death. He was the father of the famously domineering Elisabeth, Queen of Spain.

Biography
Odoardo was born on 21 August 1666 at the Ducal Palace of Colorno in Colorno outside the city of Parma. His father, Duke Ranuccio II Farnese, was the Duke of Parma and of Piacenza. His mother, Isabella d´Este, was the daughter of Francesco I d'Este, Duke of Modena and of Maria Caterina Farnese. Thus, Odoardo's parents were first cousins to each other. He was the third child of his parents, and had two older sisters, Margherita Maria Farnese, future wife of Francesco II d'Este, Duke of Modena, and Teresa Farnese, who never married but became a benedictine nun and abbess of the Saint Alessandro monastery in Parma.

Odoardo's mother, Isabella d´Este, died some twelve days after giving birth to him. She had been his father's second wife. Odoardo's father had been previously married to Princess Margaret Yolande of Savoy, first cousin of Louis XIV, but that marriage had not produced any surviving children (only two stillborn infants). After the death of Odoardo's mother, his father took a third wife, marrying the younger sister of his late spouse; thus, Odoardo's step-mother was his own aunt. This was Maria d'Este, and she bore the duke a further nine children, including two surviving sons. Among them was Francesco Farnese, twelve years younger than Odoardo, who would marry Odoardo's widow Dorothea Sophie, be a devoted and beloved step-father to Odoardo's daughter Elisabeth Farnese, and inherit the Dukedom of Parma upon the death of their father.

Marriage and issue
Odoardo Farnese married Countess Palatine Dorothea Sophie of Neuburg by proxy on 3 April 1690. The couple were married publicly at the Parma Cathedral on 17 May 1690. The marriage was negotiated by count Fabio Perletti – ambassador and counselor of Ranuccio II. The bride, who was well connected to the royalty of Europe, also brought a very large dowry to the Farnese family.

Dorothea Sophia was the daughter of Philipp Wilhelm, Elector Palatine. Three of her older sisters were, at that time, the Holy Roman Empress Consort, the Queen of Portugal and the Queen of Spain.

Odoardo died before his father and therefore never ruled. His young widow, Dorothea Sophie of Neuburg, then married Odoardo's half-brother Francesco Farnese on 8 December 1695. Francesco became Duke when their father died in 1694. However, that marriage remained childless, and the Dukedom passed to Odoardo's youngest half-brother Antonio. Antonio also remained childless, and therefore it was decided that the Dukedom would pass to Odoardo's grandson Philip, who was one of the younger sons of Odoardo's daughter, Elizabeth Farnese, Queen of Spain.

Issue
 Alessandro Ignazio Farnese (6 December 1691 – 5 August 1693);
 Elisabeth Farnese (25 October 1692 – 11 July 1766) married King Philip V of Spain and had issue.

Ancestry

Further reading
 Philip V of Spain: The King Who Reigned Twice, by Henry Kamen, Cumberland, Rhode Island: Yale University Press (2001) 

Odorado
Nobility from Parma
Odoardo
1666 births
1693 deaths
Heirs apparent who never acceded
Burials at the Sanctuary of Santa Maria della Steccata
Sons of monarchs